"Diddy Wah Diddy" is a song written by Willie Dixon and Ellas McDaniel, known as Bo Diddley, and recorded by the latter in 1956.  The song shares only its title with Blind Blake's song "Diddie Wah Diddie" recorded in 1929. Over the years, the Bo Diddley song has been covered by many bands and artists, including the Astronauts, Captain Beefheart and his Magic Band, the Remains, the Twilights, Taj Mahal, the Sonics, the Fabulous Thunderbirds, Ty Segall Band, and the Blues Band among others.

Original version by Bo Diddley 
"Diddy Wah Diddy" was Bo Diddley's fourth single release on Checker Records, and was released in early 1956. The song was recorded on November 10, 1955 at Universal Recording Corporation in Chicago, Illinois. The recording featured The Moonglows on backing vocals, Willie Dixon on bass, Jody Williams along with Bo Diddley on guitar, Clifton James on drums, Jerome Green playing the maracas, and Little Willie Smith on harmonica.

Lyrically, the song makes mention of the mythical town of Diddy Wah Diddy.  It was not unusual in the early part of the 20th century for African Americans in the southern states (particularly in Florida) to speak of various mythical cities and countries such as Beluthahatchie, Ginny Gall, Diddy Wah Diddy and West Hell as if they were real.  Of all the imaginary locations that were in common usage at the time, folklorist and ethnomusicologist Benjamin A. Botkin has noted that Diddy Wah Diddy was "the largest and best known of the Negro mythical places."  It was commonly believed that in Diddy Wah Diddy food could be found in abundance, the townsfolk did not have to work, and people and animals had no concerns.  Dixon and McDaniel's song is sung from the point of view of a man whose lover lives in this mythical location, as evidenced by such lines as...

The song is often confused with Blind Blake's similarly titled 1928 song, "Diddie Wa Diddie", which was also covered by various bands and artists mostly under the name "Diddy Wah Diddy".

Captain Beefheart version 

Captain Beefheart and his Magic Band recorded a blues rock version of the track, produced by David Gates (later the leader of Bread), in January 1966 at Sunset Sound Recorders studio in Hollywood, California. The song was the band's first single, released on the A&M label in March of that year. Some copies of the single incorrectly credit the songwriter as "A. Christensen". The song soon gained interest and became a regional hit, with the band promoting it in May, on the TV show Where the Action Is, in a mimed segment filmed on a California beach.

Captain Beefheart and his Magic Band personnel
Don Van Vliet – vocals, harmonica
Doug Moon – guitar
Alex Snouffer – drums
Jerry Handley – bass guitar
Richard Hepner – guitar

Other cover versions 
The first known cover of the song was by the Colorado-based rock band The Astronauts, on their RCA album The Astronauts Orbit Kampus, in 1964.

Around the same time as the Captain Beefheart version, in mid-1966, the Remains, from Boston, released a garage rock version of the song which became a hit in the East Coast charts.

The Sonics covered the song as a garage rock version around 1966, and it was included in the 1991 release of Maintaining My Cool and the 2004 Sundazed reissue of the album Introducing the Sonics.

Two Australian bands, The Twilights, and Mike Furber and the Bowery Boys, covered the song, again in 1966. Another Australian band, Running Jumping Standing Still, recorded a version in 1967, which charted #13 in Melbourne.

A cover by blues rock band The Fabulous Thunderbirds appeared on their 1982 album T-Bird Rhythm.

A garage rock cover of "Diddy Wah Diddy" was recorded by the Ty Segall Band for their 2012 album Slaughterhouse.

8 Eyed Spy (Lydia Lunch) released a version in 1980.

Tom Petty and the Heartbreakers covered the song in a 1997 rendition of the track which is available on their compilation live album The Live Anthology.

Indianapolis post-punk electronic band Last Four (4) Digits covered the song on a local sampler Red Snerts, released in 1981.

Other mentions 
Blind Blake's earlier, same-titled song "Diddie Wah Diddie" (see above) is referenced on the first issue cover of Robert Crumb's Zap Comix, where a woman quotes the song's racy chorus "I wish somebody would tell me what diddy-wah-diddy means" to Crumb's Mr. Natural, who responds, "If you don't know by now, lady, don't MESS with it!"
 The version by Ty Segall Band is featured on the soundtrack of Grand Theft Auto V on Vinewood Boulevard Radio.
 In "Mad Dogs and Servicemen", a third-season episode of M*A*S*H, Radar refers to "Diddy Wah Diddy" as one of his favorite records. This is an anachronism, as the Korean War ended in 1953 and "Diddy Wah Diddy" was not recorded until 1955.
In Poul Anderson's novel Operation Chaos, Diddy-Wah-Diddy is a place in the Hell universe.

References

External links 
 Diddy Wah Diddy at Allmusic

1956 singles
1966 singles
Bo Diddley songs
Checker Records singles
Songs written by Bo Diddley
Songs written by Willie Dixon
Captain Beefheart songs
1956 songs